Mats Jonsson is the name of:

 Mats Jonsson (cartoonist) (born 1973), Swedish comic creator
 Mats Jonsson (rally driver) (born 1957), Swedish rally driver